The Netherlands women's national basketball team represents the Netherlands in international women's basketball competitions.

Competitive record

FIBA World Cup

EuroBasket Women

Results and fixtures

2021

2022

2023

Team

Current roster
Roster for the EuroBasket Women 2021 qualification games.

See also
 Netherlands women's national under-19 basketball team
 Netherlands men's national basketball team

External links 
 Official website 
 Eurobasket 2015 profile

References

Basketball
Basketball in the Netherlands
Basketball teams in the Netherlands
Women's national basketball teams
Women's basketball in the Netherlands